Shani is a Local Government Area of Borno State, Nigeria. Its headquarters are in the town of Shani.
 
Shani Local Government Area is located in the southeastern axis of Borno state. It is bordered by Bayo, Hawul, and Kwaya Local Government Area. Its administrative headquarters lies in the heart of Shani town.

The postal code of the area is 603.

References

Local Government Areas in Borno State
Populated places in Borno State